The Russian Consulate General in Jerusalem was the diplomatic mission of the Russian Empire to the Ottoman Empire, in Jerusalem. The consulate was established in 1858, and operated in the city until 1914.

History
The Russian Consulate General was established in Jerusalem in December 1858.

 In 1914 the Ottoman Empire was at war with the Russian Empire, forcing the Russian consuls to leave for Egypt. Since that time, the Russian diplomatic presence in Jerusalem ended. During the British Mandate for Palestine, the British made the consulate building and its surroundings their administrative centre. Since the establishment of the State of Israel in 1948, the consulate building is used by Jerusalem municipal departments.

List of Consuls
Vladimir Dorgobozhinov 1858–1860
Konstantin Sokolov 1860–1862
Andrei Kratsov 1862–1867
Vasily Kuznikov 1867–1876
Nikolai Illarionov 1876–1878
Kuznikov 1879–1884
Alexander Gears 1884–1885
Dmitriy Bukharov 1886–1888
Alexey Pliev 1888–1889
Sergey Maksimov 1889–1891
Sergey Arsenyev 1891–1897
Alexander Jacoblev 1897–1907
Alexey Kruglov 1908-1914

References

 
Bilateral relations of the State of Palestine
Bilateral relations of Russia